The Sri Sathya Sai International Organization (SSSIO) is a spiritual and humanitarian non-governmental organization founded in the 1960s by Sathya Sai Baba, an Indian guru and spiritual leader. It primarily works within the areas of education and humanitarian aid, in India and internationally.

The SSSIO is an umbrella organization which runs several institutes, trusts and associations.

References

External links
 Official website

Sathya Sai Baba
Hindu organizations
Religious organisations based in India
Hindu new religious movements
Puttaparthi